Casa Cecilia is an Italian television series.

Cast
Delia Scala: Cecilia
Giancarlo Dettori: Aldo Tanzi
Davide Lepore: Ugo Tanzi
Stefania Graziosi: Terry Tanzi
Claudio Mazzenga: Gabriele Tanzi
Zoe Incrocci: Rina
Alida Valli (first season)

See also
List of Italian television series

External links
 

Italian television series
RAI original programming